List of champions of the 1899 U.S. National Championships tennis tournament (now known as the US Open). The men's tournament was held from 14 August to 21 August on the outdoor grass courts at the Newport Casino in Newport, Rhode Island. The women's tournament was held from 21 June to 24 June on the outdoor grass courts at the Philadelphia Cricket Club in Philadelphia, Pennsylvania. It was the 19th U.S. National Championships and the second Grand Slam tournament of the year.

Finals

Men's singles

 Malcolm Whitman defeated  J. Parmly Paret  6–1, 6–2, 3–6, 7–5

Women's singles

 Marion Jones defeated  Maud Banks  6–1, 6–1, 7–5

Men's doubles
 Holcombe Ward /  Dwight Davis defeated  Leo Ware /  George Sheldon 6–4, 6–4, 6–3

Women's doubles
 Jane Craven /  Myrtle McAteer defeated  Maud Banks /  Elizabeth Rastall 6–1, 6–1, 7–5

Mixed doubles
 Elizabeth Rastall /  Albert Hoskins defeated  Jane Craven /  James Gardner 6–4, 6–0, ret.

References

External links
Official US Open website

 
U.S. National Championships
U.S. National Championships (tennis) by year
U.S. National Championships
U.S. National Championships
U.S. National Championships
U.S. National Championships
U.S. National Championships